Tajik Telecom Qughonteppa founded 1999 is a football club based in Qurghonteppa, Tajikistan.

History

Domestic history

References

Football clubs in Tajikistan
1999 establishments in Tajikistan
Association football clubs established in 1999